Chynadiieve or Chynadiiovo (Ukrainian: Чинадієвe, Чинадієво; Rusyn: Чинадійово; Hungarian: Szentmiklós, Russian: Чинадиево, Slovak: Činadno) is an urban-type settlement in Mukachevo Raion of Zakarpattia Oblast, Ukraine. It stands in the Latorica River valley, 10 km from the town of Mukacheve.

The town took its Hungarian name from the church of St. Nicholas (Szentmiklós). Its history can be traced to the 13th century. King Béla IV presented the area to his son-in-law, Rostislav Mikhailovich, in 1247. It changed hands many times in the 14th century.

Péter Perényi, who owned Szentmiklós in the early 15th century, commenced building a castle. It suffered serious damage at the hands of Jerzy Sebastian Lubomirski's forces in 1657. The surviving edifice is the upshot of Francis I Rákóczi's rebuilding campaign.

After the defeat of Rákóczi's War for Independence Emperor Charles VI gave Mukacheve and Chynadiieve to Archbishop Lothar Franz von Schönborn. A year later it passed to his nephew, Bishop Friedrich Karl von Schönborn-Buchheim.

The Schönborn era continued in Chynadiieve well into the 20th century. The Mukachevo-Chynadiieve estate was one of the largest in Eastern Europe. As of 1731, the estate comprised 200 villages and 4 towns, covering an area of some 2,400 km2.

The town's most striking landmark is the hunting lodge of the Schönborns, originally built of timber, but rebuilt as a large country residence to a fanciful revivalist design in the 1890s.

Notable people
 Vasyl Turyanchyk, Soviet footballer, FC Hoverla Uzhhorod player

See also
 Kolchyno, the other urban-type settlement in Mukachevo Raion of Zakarpattia Oblast

References

 
Urban-type settlements in Mukachevo Raion